Bukit Beruang is a town in Melaka Tengah District, Malacca, Malaysia named after its eponymous hill with a height of , a famous spot for hiking. The most famous landmark in Bukit Beruang is the state branch of Multimedia University, a private university owned by Telekom Malaysia, a Malaysian telecommunication company.

Residential estates

Rumah Awam Bukit Beruang (the earliest among the earliest)
Taman Bunga Raya- TBRS3 & TBR'Teratai (road to Bukit Beruang)
Taman Bukit Melaka
Taman Kerjasama-(earliest taman in Bkt Beruang)
Taman Faridah-(Only have 6 house)
Taman Megah
Taman Bukit Beruang
Taman Bukit Beruang Utama- 7 Terbalek B.A.Sejagat
Taman Dahlia
Taman Bukit Beruang Permai
Taman Bukit Beruang Indah
Taman Sentosa
Taman Seroja
Kampung Bukit Beruang Jaya
Taman Melawis
Kampung Baru Bukit Beruang
Kampung Saga Bukit Beruang
Kampung Wakaf
Kampung Telok
Flat Polis Seri Temenggong
Ixora MMU Kondom
Taman Saujana Gemok Wan Shairul

Education
 Bukit Beruang National School
 Multimedia University Malacca Branch
 Bukit Beruang (Chinese) National Type School

Hotels
Beruang Hill Urban Resort

References

Populated places in Malacca